Dr Sumita Mukherjee is a historian of British Empire and Indian Subcontinent. She is an Associate Professor in History at the University of Bristol. She is the author of Nationalism, Education and Migrant Identities: The England-Returned (2010) and Indian Suffragettes: Female Identities and Transnational Networks (2018).

Her work focuses primarily on the transnational mobility of South Asian people during the 19th and 20th centuries.

Career 
Mukherjee has been awarded a BA degree from Durham University as well as a MSt and PhD from University of Oxford. Before teaching at the University of Bristol, she taught at University of Cambridge, De Montfort, Glasgow, King's College London, London School of Economics and Oxford.

Bibliography 
 Nationalism, Education and Migrant Identities: The England-Returned, Oxford University Press,  
 Indian Suffragettes: Female Identities and Transnational Networks, Routledge 
 (co-edited with Sadia Zulfiqar) Islam and the West: A Love Story?, Cambridge Scholars Publishing 
 (co-edited with Rehana Ahmed) South Asian Resistances in Britain, 1858-1947, Bloomsbury, 
 (co-edited with Ruvani Ranasinha, with Rehana Ahmed, Florian Stadtler) South Asians and the Shaping of Britain, 1870-1950, Manchester University Press,

References

British historians
British Asian writers
British women historians
Feminist historians
Alumni of Durham University
Alumni of the University of Oxford
Year of birth missing (living people)
Living people